Kaoliang liquor, Gaoliang liquor or Sorghum liquor is a strong distilled liquor of Chinese origin made from fermented sorghum. It is a type of light-aroma Baijiu. The liquor originates from Dazhigu (located east of Tianjin), first appearing in the Ming Dynasty and is widely consumed across northern China in provinces such as Hebei, Shaanxi, and Shandong. It is primarily made and sold in China and Taiwan, but is also popular in Korea, where it is called goryangju or bbaegal (which originates from the Chinese character ). Kaoliang ranges usually between 38 and 63 percent alcohol by volume. At present, world's highest alcohol content of kaoliang liquor is up to 92% produced by Chyi Leh Wei Distillery in Taiwan.

Famous brands from Taiwan 

Kinmen Kaoliang Liquor is one of the most popular brands of kaoliang in Taiwan. As its name indicates, it is produced on the island of Kinmen. The mainstays of the range are the standard 58 percent and 38 percent alcohol bottlings. Kinmen's kaoliang production traces its roots back to the Chinese Civil War when Chinese nationalist general Hu Lien encouraged Kinmenese farmers to grow sorghum to produce hard liquor as importing alcohol from Taiwan caused financial strain. Kaoliang liquor has become an integral part of Kinmen's economy and plays a significant role in the culture of Kinmen.

Yusan Kaoliang Chiew is produced by the Taiwan Tobacco and Liquor Corporation. It is named after the highest mountain in Taiwan, Yushan. One of the most notable products in the range is an "X.O." kaoliang aged for five years in tanks before bottling.

Matsu Tunnel 88 Kaoliang Liquor is produced by the Matsu Distillery in Nangan Township, Lienchiang County. The name is derived from the name of an abandoned military tunnel called Tunnel 88 which the distillery took over as storage space for their kaoliang and aged rice wine. All of the distillery's aged kaoliangs are stored in the tunnel for at least five years.

In popular culture
 The 1987 Zhang Yimou film Red Sorghum is set in a rural kaoliang distillery in the Shandong province of China.
 The fictional character Li Kao, from Barry Hughart's award-winning novels Bridge of Birds, The Story of the Stone, and Eight Skilled Gentlemen, is named after kaoliang; his mother died in childbirth while requesting a last drink, and the abbot attending the birth mistook the syllables "Kao...li...kao..." as her intended name for the child. In Bridge of Birds, while telling the story of his birth, Li Kao describes kaoliang as "the finest paint thinner and worst wine ever invented".
 Kaoliang is an important catalyst of the action in the story "New Year's Eve" in Taiwanese writer Pai Hsien-yung's short story collection Taipei People.

See also
Baijiu
Chinese alcoholic beverages
Maotai

References

Baijiu
Chinese alcoholic drinks
Sorghum